Belinda Cordwell was the defending champion, but lost in the second round to Patricia Hy.

Naoko Sawamatsu won the title by defeating Sarah Loosemore 7–6(7–5), 3–6, 6–4 in the final.

Seeds
The first eight seeds received a bye to the second round.

Draw

Finals

Top half

Section 1

Section 2

Bottom half

Section 3

Section 4

References

External links
 Official results archive (ITF)

DHL singles
WTA Singapore Open
1990 in Singaporean sport